Pietro Lesana is an Italian bobsledder who competed in the mid-1960s. He won a silver medal in the four-man event at the 1965 FIBT World Championships in St. Moritz.

References
Bobsleigh four-man world championship medalists since 1930

Italian male bobsledders
Living people
Year of birth missing (living people)
Place of birth missing (living people)
20th-century Italian people